Hyposmocoma discella is a species of moth of the family Cosmopterigidae. It was first described by Lord Walsingham in 1907. It is endemic to the Hawaiian island of Kauai.

The larvae probably feed on lichen on the bark of Cheirodendron and Metrosideros. The larva makes an irregular case of silk and frass encrusted with miscellaneous fragments, some of which are insect remains.

External links

discella
Endemic moths of Hawaii
Moths described in 1907
Taxa named by Thomas de Grey, 6th Baron Walsingham